Corregimiento is a term used in Colombia to define a subdivision of Colombian municipalities. According to the Colombian Constitution of 1991 and Decree 2274 of October 4, 1991, a corregimiento is an internal part of a Department or province, which includes a population core. It is usually less populated than a municipality..

Historically, a corregimiento was administered by a corregidor.

See also
 Communes of Medellín

References
Instituto Geografico Agustin Codazzi; Division Politico Administrativa de Colombia: Entidades Territoriales

 
Subdivisions of Colombia